The 2017–18 RFU Senior Vase is the 12th version of the RFU Senior Vase national cup competition for clubs at level 8 of the English rugby union system.  The competition consists of 94 clubs divided into four regions.  The winners of each region then advance to the national semi-finals with the final being held at Twickenham Stadium in London at the end of the season, along with the RFU Intermediate Cup and RFU Junior Vase finals.

The 2017–18 champions were Wath-upon-Dearne, who pipped Cornish side Saltash, 22–18 in an entertaining final.  It was Wath-upon-Dearne's second final in the competition, having lost to south-west side, Wells, in the 2012 edition.  By claiming the vase they also replicated West Leeds (winners in 2016) to become the second Yorkshire club to win the competition since its inception back in the 2006–07 season.

London & South East Senior Vase

The London & South East Senior Vase involves a knock-out competition with 1st round, 2nd round, 3rd round, semi-finals and final.   The winners of the London & South East Senior Vase then go on to the national Senior Vase semi-finals where they face the winners of the South West Senior Vase.  There are 26 teams involved in the London & South East Senior Vase, all of which are 1st XV sides, coming from the following unions and level 8 leagues.

Round 1

Byes: Bromley (L3SE), Portsmouth (L3SW), Old Cranleighans (L3SW), Thanet Wanderers (L3SE), 	Warlingham (L3SW), Welwyn (L3NW)

Round 2

Round 3

Semi-finals

Final

The winners of the London & South East Senior Vase final would advance to the national semi-finals.

Midlands Senior Vase

The Midlands Senior Vase is a direct knockout cup with a 1st round, 2nd round, 3rd round, quarter-finals, semi-finals and final  The winner of the final goes forward to the National Vase semi-finals where they face the winners of the Northern section. The competition involves 35 clubs from the following unions and level 8 leagues:

10 Midlands 3 West (North)
7 Midlands 3 West (South)
8 Midlands 3 East (North)
10 Midlands 3 East (South)

Round 1

Byes: 32 teams were given a bye into the 2nd round

Round 2

Round 3

Quarter-finals

Semi-finals

Final

The winners of the Midlands Senior Vase would advance to the National Senior Vase semi-finals.

Northern Senior Vase

Unlike the other regional competitions, the Northern Senior Vase starts with a mini-league stage, in which the eligible clubs are placed in 2 regional pools of 3 teams each.  The winners of each pool then face each other in the Northern Senior Vase final, with the winner advancing to the National Senior Vase semi-finals, where they will face the winners of the Midlands section.  There are 6 teams (1st XV only) involved in the Northern Senior Vase representing the following unions and level 8 leagues:

Pool 1 (West)

Pool 2 (East)

Final

The winners of the Pool 1 (West) and Pool 2 (East) would meet in the Northern Senior Vase final.  The winners of this final would then advanced to the National Senior Vase semi-finals.

South West Senior Vase

The South West Senior Vase consist of three stages, with representatives from the different unions joining at different points.  The Dorset & Wilts and Gloucestershire clubs first play in county based knock-out tournaments, with the winners advancing to either the Southern Counties or South West Counties area semi-finals, where they join the other south-west representatives.  The winners of each area final then meet in the South West Senior Vase final to determine who goes through to the national semi-finals, where they face the winners of the London and South East section.

The South West Senior Vase involves 27 clubs (1st XV only) from the following unions and level 8 leagues:

Stage 1 (Dorset & Wilts)

10 clubs (1st XV only) were involved in the Dorset & Wilts RFU Senior Vase qualification.  The winners would advanced to the Southern Counties semi-finals.

Stage 1 (Gloucestershire)

11 teams were involved in the Gloucestershire RFU Senior Vase qualification tournament.  The winners of the competition would go through to the South West Counties final.

Stage 2 (Southern Counties)

The winners of the Dorset & Wilts Senior Vase would join representatives from the Berkshire, Buckinghamshire and Oxfordshire unions in the Southern Counties knock-out stage.  The winners would advance to play the South West Counties winners in the south-west regional final.

Stage 2 (South West Counties)

The winners of the Gloucestershire Senior Vase would meet the representatives from the Somerset RFU in the semi-final, while the representatives from the Cornwall RFU would face the representatives from the Devon RFU.  The winners would advance to play the Southern Counties winners in the south-west regional final.

Stage 3 (South West final)

The winners of the Southern Counties and South West Counties final would meet in the south-west regional final.  The winners of this final would then advanced to the national semi-finals.

National Senior Vase

4 teams qualified from the regional vase competitions:
London & South East Senior Vase – Old Cranleighans (L3SW)
Midlands Senior Vase – St Ives (M3ES)
Northern Senior Vase – Wath-upon-Dearne (Y2)
South West Senior Vase – Saltash (CD)

The Midlands winners would face the North winners in the first semi-final, while the London & South East winners would face the South-West winners in the other, with the winners of each semi-final meeting in the Twickenham final.  Home advantage in the semi-finals will be decided by a draw.

Semi-finals

Final

See also
 2017–18 Anglo-Welsh Cup
 2017–18 British and Irish Cup
 2017–18 RFU Intermediate Cup
 2017–18 RFU Junior Vase
 RFU Intermediate Cup
 English rugby union system
 List of English rugby union teams
 Rugby union in England

Notes

References

External links
 RFU

2017–18 rugby union tournaments for clubs
Rugby union competitions in England
Rugby union cup competitions in England